Gravenhurst/Sniders Bay Water Aerodrome  is located in Sniders Bay, Pine Lake, and is  west northwest of Gravenhurst, Ontario, Canada.

References

Registered aerodromes in Ontario
Seaplane bases in Ontario
Transport in the District Municipality of Muskoka